The Cashman Center or the Cashman Field Center is a  complex on a  site in Las Vegas, Nevada. Operated by the City of Las Vegas, it includes Cashman Field and a permanently closed  convention center.  The center was mostly used for local events, but did host national events like the second 2008 Democratic presidential debate and the 2008-09 United States Bowling Congress Open Championships.

History 
The center opened in 1948. The convention center closed in 2017.  The final event was the Moscow Ballet in December 2017. The convention center will be replaced by a larger downtown expo center.

The adjacent field complex remains open and in use. During the COVID-19 pandemic, the parking lot was painted with spaces six feet apart to enforce social distancing among the homeless people that were sleeping there while a shelter was being cleaned after an infected person had been at the facility.

References 

Buildings and structures in Las Vegas
Convention centers in the Las Vegas Valley